GFW High School is a secondary school located in Winthrop, Minnesota.  It is part of the GFW Schools school district.

Academics 
Four advanced placement courses are offered (Government, Calculus, Literature, and Biology).  At the end of these courses students take an exam, and depending on their score they may earn college credits.

Athletics 
The school offers the following sports:

GFW is a member of the Tomahawk conference for all sports except football (which the conference doesn't offer).  For football, GFW is a member of the Gopher Valley AA conference.

References

External links
 Official site

Schools in Sibley County, Minnesota
Schools in Renville County, Minnesota
Schools in McLeod County, Minnesota
Education in Sibley County, Minnesota
Education in Renville County, Minnesota
Education in McLeod County, Minnesota
Educational institutions established in 1987
1987 establishments in Minnesota